Immer bereit is an East German documentary film about the nationwide Free German Youth (FDJ) meeting in Berlin in 1950. It was released in 1950.

External links
 

1950 films
East German films
1950s German-language films
1950 documentary films
1950s German films